was the forty-seventh of the fifty-three stations of the Tōkaidō connecting Edo with Kyoto in Edo period Japan. It was  located in former Ise Province in what is now the Seki neighborhood of the city of Kameyama, Mie Prefecture, Japan.

History
Although the theory that Seki-juku was the location of the ancient Suzuka Barrier, an administrative checkpoint on the highway controlling access to the capital from the eastern provinces, is no longer valid, the Suzuka Barrier was located nearby. From the Kamakura period, traffic on the road between Kyoto and Kamakura increased, not only for samurai, but also for merchants and priests. In the early Edo period, the system of post stations on the Tōkaidō was formalized by the Tokugawa shogunate in 1601, Seki-juku became an official post station  It was on the sankin-kōtai route by many western daimyō  to-and-from the Shogun's court in Edo.  

It had one Tonyaba, for the stabling of packhorses and warehousing of goods, and one kōsatsu for the display of official notifications. It was 416.9 kilometers from Edo.

Following the Meiji Restoration, Seki-juku became the nucleus for the modern town of Seki, which became part of the city of Kameyama in 2005. Many of the historical buildings have been preserved and the area has been designated as Important Preservation District for Groups of Traditional Buildings.

Gallery

Seki-juku in The Fifty-three Stations of the Tōkaidō
Utagawa Hiroshige's ukiyo-e Hōeidō edition print of Seki-juku dates from 1833 -1834. The print  depicts the early morning preparations for departure of a daimyō procession on sankin-kōtai from one of the honjin. A number of lower-ranking retainers with long spears are tying their travel hats and sandals, while in the background, a number of higher ranking samurai with their two swords are waiting by the entrance for other members of the party to appear. The sky is still dark, and a number of chōchin travel lanterns are in evidence.

Neighboring post towns
Tōkaidō
Kameyama-juku - Seki-juku - Sakashita-juku

See also
Groups of Traditional Buildings

References

Further reading

Carey, Patrick. Rediscovering the Old Tokaido:In the Footsteps of Hiroshige. Global Books UK (2000). 
Chiba, Reiko. Hiroshige's Tokaido in Prints and Poetry. Tuttle. (1982) 
Taganau, Jilly. The Tokaido Road: Travelling and Representation in Edo and Meiji Japan. RoutledgeCurzon (2004).

External links

THE WOODBLOCK PRINTS OF UTAGAWA HIROSHIGE The Great Tōkaidō
Kameyama City home page 
Mie Prefectural Tourist Association home page 

Stations of the Tōkaidō
Stations of the Tōkaidō in Mie Prefecture
Ise Province
Kameyama, Mie